The BMW Sauber F1.09 was the Formula One car with which the BMW Sauber team competed in the 2009 Formula One World Championship. The car was launched on 20 January 2009 at Circuit de Valencia in Spain. The chassis was designed by Willy Rampf, Walter Reidl, Christoph Zimmermann and Willem Toet with the powertrain being designed by Markus Duesmann.

After the team's impressive performance in 2008, winning their first race and coming third in the championship, much was expected of them. BMW made a promising start to the season, with Kubica running second at Melbourne and lapping faster than the leader before retiring in a collision, and Heidfeld finishing second at the chaotic Malaysian GP. However, the F1.09 ultimately proved to be disappointing. At times, the drivers could barely scrape through to Q2, let alone challenge for pole. Both drivers expressed discontent with the slow developments to the car. Towards the end of the season things began to look up, with the cars managing fourth and fifth at Spa-Francorchamps and Kubica finishing second at Brazil. However, the damage had been done, and BMW announced that 2009 would be their last season in Formula One. The team eventually finished sixth in the Constructors' Championship.

Complete Formula One results
(key) (results in bold indicate pole position; results in italics indicate fastest lap)

 Driver failed to finish, but was classified as they had completed >90% of the race distance.
 Half points awarded as less than 75% of race distance completed.

References

2009 Formula One season cars
BMW Sauber Formula One cars
Sauber F1.09